Sup'Com (or SUP'COM or Higher School of Communication of Tunis or Engineering School of Communication of Tunis), founded in 1998, is the main school of educating engineers in telecommunications in Tunisia. It is affiliated to the University of Carthage and occupies the advanced ranks in the competitive examination for the access to the engineering studies.

As a school of national elites, Sup’Com evenly benefits from the tutelage of both, the Ministry of Higher Education and Scientific Researchand the Ministry of Information and Communication Technology.

Member of the Réseau Méditerranéen des Ecoles d'Ingénieurs (Mediterranean engineering schools’ network), Sup’Com was admitted since December 2008 as an associated member in the Conférence des Grandes Écoles (CGE), it is furthermore the first foreign school to be associated internationally with the Institut Mines-Télécom.

Sup’Com is an engineering school, which main objectives are:
 Training engineers with a higher scientific and technical level, capable to conceive, implement and manage services, systems and telecommunication networks.
 Contributing to the national effort related to the scientific and technological research in the field of information and communication technology (ICT).
 The in-service or qualifying training, of senior managers in the ICT field.
With the admission, of the first 150 candidates over 8500, in the competitive examination for the access to the engineering studies, Sup’Com made the choice of quality and the distinguished pedagogical and scientific supervision.

The biannual teaching is organized into modules provided in diverse forms (integrated courses, practical, customized works and mini projects).

Departements and laboratories
There are 4 departments in Sup’ Com:
 Electronics, physics and distribution
 Applied mathematics, signals and communications
 Computer and networks
 Economy, management, law, humanities and languages

The supervised practice, important component of engineer's course, takes place in the diverse laboratories of the university:
 Electronics, optics, transmission and microwaves laboratory
 Simulation and computer-aided design laboratory
 Mobile networks laboratory
 Broadcasting and multimedia laboratory
 Computer science laboratory with microcomputers and working stations connected to networks
 Switching systems laboratory
 Language laboratory

Diplomas
SUP' COM awards the following diplomas:
 National Diploma in Telecommunications Engineering
 Master's degree in ICT
 Master's degree in Telecommunications
 PhD in ICT
 Merit Award in ICT.

See also
 Carthage University

References

Universities in Tunisia
Educational institutions established in 1998
Education in Tunis
1998 establishments in Tunisia